Sarandeep Singh  (born 21 October 1979) is an Indian cricketer. He is a right-handed batsman and a right-arm offbreak bowler. In his debut Test match he took six wickets in Nagpur. Singh started his career in Amritsar in 1998–1999, playing for Punjab and before the end of the year, he was playing for the Under-19 squad.

He was bought by Delhi Daredevils.

Singh took 37 wickets at the 1999-2000 Ranji Trophy and was selected in 2000 for the first intake of the National Cricket Academy in Bangalore. He was one of the current national selector in the Indian cricket team.

References 

Indian cricketers
1979 births
Living people
India One Day International cricketers
India Test cricketers
Delhi cricketers
Punjab, India cricketers
North Zone cricketers
Cricketers from Amritsar
Indian Sikhs
Delhi Capitals cricketers
Himachal Pradesh cricketers
Indian cricket commentators